This is a list of the Egypt national football team results scheduled to be played in 2020 or later.

2020s

2020

2021

2022

2023

Head-to-head records

References

2020s
2020s in Egypt
2030s in Egypt